Newton International School is a private school located in Doha, Qatar. All pupils follow the National Curriculum of England and Wales.

The school was founded in 2006. There are several branches in the city of Doha.

References

External links
Official website

2006 establishments in Qatar
Educational institutions established in 2006
British international schools in Qatar
Schools in Doha